Euskirchen Zuckerfabrik station is a railway station in the municipality of Euskirchen, located in the Euskirchen district in North Rhine-Westphalia, Germany.

The station became a request stop with the change of the 2002 timetable.

Location
The station is located near the sugar refinery of Pfeifer & Langen.

References

Railway stations in North Rhine-Westphalia
Buildings and structures in Euskirchen (district)
Railway stations in Germany opened in 1928